She Gods of Shark Reef is a 1958 B-adventure film directed by Roger Corman that was partially filmed on location in Kaua'i back to back with Thunder over Hawaii in 1956. The film was distributed in 1958 by American International Pictures as a double feature with Night of the Blood Beast.

Plot
A young and reckless criminal, Jim (Don Durant), stows away on his brother Chris Johnston's (Bill Cord) boat after killing two men interrupting his gun running. As they sail out to the Sulu Sea, they are caught in a terrible storm and are shipwrecked off a beautiful island that is inhabited by a secretive all-female village of pearl divers. Though the lonely and beautiful women of the island are friendly and flirtatious with the two brothers (the only remaining survivors), the village elder Queen Pua (Jeanne Gearson) is cautious and hostile, wanting the two off the island as soon as possible. Chris falls in love with one of the island beauties, Mahia (Lisa Montell), while Jim, being a wanted man, seeks to escape before the naval ship sent to rescue them arrives. Terrified of being recognized and executed for his crimes, Jim fixes one of the islanders' broken boats and lets his brother and his forbidden love in on his plan. But before they can leave, the black-hearted criminal is overcome by greed and steals the islanders' precious pearls, injuring a native in the process. Once out to sea, Chris discovers what his sibling has done and tries to stop him in a fight on some jagged rocks. Jim tries to get away, but he gets tangled in the boat's ropes and falls to the sea, where a shark kills him, finally punishing him for his crimes.

Cast
 Bill Cord as Chris, alias Christy Johnston
 Don Durant as Jim, alias Lee Johnston
 Lisa Montell as Mahia
 Jeanne Gerson as Queen Pua
 Carol Lindsay as One of the Hula Dancers
 Ed Nelson as Guard
 Beverly Rivera as Island Girl

Production
The film was announced in July 1956 with singer Don Durant to make his acting debut.

The film was originally entitled Shark Reef, with the "She Gods" part added at the insistence of American International Pictures, who picked it up for distribution. It was shot in two weeks back to back with Naked Paradise, with Corman only taking one day off in between. Corman says the experience was his most enjoyable one making movies to date.

The film was shot at the Coco Palms Resort with the thatched huts of the hotel grounds being used as the native village. Corman only had one shark to photograph, but obtained stock footage of other sharks

Corman left for Hawaii to make it in August 1958.

The film was made for an independent, Ludwig H. Gerber, who was hoping for the film to be picked up and released by a major studio. This did not happen. The film was instead sold to AIP in 1958, who released it.

Reception
The Monthly Film Bulletin called it "a poor script, indifferently performed." The Los Angeles Times said it only had two things to recommend it: "it is in color and it is only 63 minutes long." Film critic Lisa Marie Bowman wrote that the film has a "somewhat haphazard story", that its "low budget is obvious in every frame," and "[t]his is one of those films where the action stops for nearly five minutes so that [director] Corman can film a hula dancer."

See also
 List of films in the public domain in the United States

References

External links

 
 
 
 
 She Gods of Shark Reef commentary by Roger Corman
  (public domain)

1958 films
1958 adventure films
American International Pictures films
American black-and-white films
1950s English-language films
1950s exploitation films
Films directed by Roger Corman
Films set in Oceania
Films shot in Hawaii
1958 crime drama films
Films scored by Ronald Stein
Films produced by Roger Corman